Carex breviculmis, called the Asian shortstem sedge, is a species of flowering plant in the genus Carex, native to Asia from the Indian subcontinent to Southeast Asia, China, Taiwan, Korea, Japan, north as far as Khabarovsk Krai, and Malesia, New Guinea, Australia, Norfolk Island and New Zealand. It has been introduced to the US state of Mississippi. Typically found in forests, it is quite shade tolerant.

Subtaxa
The following varieties are currently accepted:
Carex breviculmis var. breviculmis
Carex breviculmis var. discoidea (Boott) Boott – Japan
Carex breviculmis var. fibrillosa (Franch. & Sav.) Matsum. & Hayata – China, South Korea, Japan, Taiwan
Carex breviculmis var. montivaga (S.T.Blake) Noot. – New Guinea
Carex breviculmis var. perciliata Kük. – Malesia to New Guinea
Carex breviculmis var. puberula (Boott) Makino – Japan

References

breviculmis
Plants described in 1810